Harpagophana is a genus of moths of the family Noctuidae.

Species
 Harpagophana hilaris (Staudinger, 1895)

References
Natural History Museum Lepidoptera genus database
Harpagophana at funet

Cuculliinae